In the Winter Dark may refer to:

 In the Winter Dark, 1988 novel by Tim Winton
 In the Winter Dark (film), 1998 film adaptation of the novel